The Commodity Exchange Authority was a former regulatory agency of USDA. It was established to 
administer the Commodity Exchange Act of 1936; it was the predecessor to the Commodity Futures Trading Commission (CFTC).

References 

United States Department of Agriculture
United States federal commodity and futures law